Wadi Hanifa, historically known as Wadi al-Arad, is a wadi (valley) in the Najd region, Riyadh Province, in central Saudi Arabia. A string of towns and villages lie along the valley, including Uyaynah, Irqah and Diriyah. The historical city of Riyadh itself is on the northeastern side of the wadi, but the city has now expanded across Wadi Hanifa, with the sub-municipalities of Al-Shifa and Al-Urayja on its southwestern side.

History 
In ancient times, the wadi was known as al-Irdh. Its current name is derived from that of the Banu Hanifa, the principal Arab tribe in the area at the time of the Islamic conquest of Arabia.
 
In pre-historic times, rain fell heavily in the region. This is reflected in the local folk tradition that claims that during the reign of the ancient kingdom of Al-Yamamah, the area was once covered with oases and fertile farmland. God became angry and visited a plague of locusts and drought that the land never recovered from. Modern climate studies would likely show that the local catastrophe was actually the effect of global climate changes. Ongoing and future changes could bring higher precipitation levels back to the region.

Climate 
Rain falls with great intensity for short periods, causing flash floods. The nature of the dry, warm climate leads to a high percentage of the scarce rainfall being instantly evaporated. That which remains mostly ends up as groundwater. While abundant, the levels of the water table are being tested by the rapid growth the city of Riyadh has seen in the past fifty years, from a population of 150,000 in 1960 to an estimated 5 million today.

Development 

While the wadi has traditionally been dry except for during times of flooding, the construction of Riyadh's first large sewage treatment facility in 1982 has channelled  of runoff downstream daily, creating a constantly expanding area of small lakes south of Riyadh. A new green corridor nearly 100 kilometers long has been formed. The Saudi government and the Ar-Riyad Development Authority appointed Buro Happold and Moriyama & Teshima architects  to plan the preservation of the wetlands of the Wadi Hanifa, as they had become a popular destination for recreational activities such as fishing and picnicking and have also become a stop for migratory birds. The government has invested over $100 million (US) into an environmental rehabilitation project. This includes the construction of dams to regulate water flow, new limits on land use such as the banning of such commercial activities as quarrying and the planting of reeds to further purify the treated and untreated sewage. The completed project won the 2010 Aga Khan Award for Architecture. The increase in surface water has led to widespread date palm cultivation along the banks of the wadi. The treated water is given free of charge from the government to farmers which has led to much higher yields. More importantly for the economy, the government uses much of the water to run one of the largest oil refineries in the country. The city of Riyadh also pumps a portion back into the city to irrigate its public gardens and parks.

See also

Tuwaiq
Manfuha
Al-Hayir

References

al-Asad, Mohammad & Yildirum Yavuz. Wadi Hanifa Development Plan. Ar-Riyadh Development Authority, 2001/2004.
al-Nuaim, Dr. Abdullah Al Ali. Address. “A Profile of the Experience of Building and the Modern Development of Riyadh City,” Riyadh as Arab Cultural Capital for 2000. Royal Embassy of Saudi Arabia. Washington, 22 May 2000.
al-Weshah, Dr. Radwan A., Hydrology of Wadi Systems. Damascus: Arab Center for the Studies of Arid Zones and Dry Lands, 2002.
Bodeker, Jens. “Architect’s Record of Wadi Hanifa Wetlands.” ArchNet: Islamic Architecture Community. 2001. Aga Khan Trust for Culture. http://archnet.org/library/sites/one-site.tcl?site_id=4168
 High Commission for the Development of ArRiyadh. ArRiyadh Geography. 2007. ArRiyadh City Web Site. http://www.arriyadh.com/En/Ab-Arriyad/LeftBar/Geography/alrriyadh-gogrphy.doc_cvt.asp

Saudi Arabia. Ministry of Foreign Affairs. Government News 04/03/2006. Riyadh: http://www.mofa.gov.sa/detail.asp?InNewsItemID=45467&InTemplateKey=print, 2006.
Saudi Arabia. Saudi Press Agency. “Prince Salman bin Abdulaziz Inspects Wadi Hanifa Environmental Rehabilitation Project.” Riyadh: http://www.spa.gov.sa/English/details.php?id=330976, 2007.

External links

Hanifa
Najd